Rioja or La Rioja may refer to:

Rioja (wine), a wine region in Spain

Places
La Rioja, Spain, an autonomous community and province
La Rioja (Congress of Deputies constituency)
La Rioja (Senate constituency)
University of La Rioja
Rioja, Almería, Spain
Rioja Province (Peru)
Rioja District, one of the districts of Rioja Province
Rioja, Peru, the capital of the Rioja Province
La Rioja, Argentina
La Rioja Province, Argentina
National University of La Rioja

People
Bernardino Bilbao Rioja (1895–1983), Bolivian military officer and politician
Francisco de Rioja (1583–1659), Spanish poet, canon of Seville Cathedral, member of the Spanish Inquisition

Other uses

209083 Rioja, a minor planet named after the wine
Submarine telecommunications cable systems RIOJA-1, RIOJA-2, RIOJA-3. 
Rioja (moth), a genus of Pyralidae moths